Rubiaco is a village and alqueria located in the municipality of Nuñomoral, in Cáceres province, Extremadura, Spain. As of 2020, it has a population of 81.

Geography 
Rubiaco is located 172km north of Cáceres, Spain.

References

Populated places in the Province of Cáceres